Nick Miller (born September 15, 1931) is a former Canadian football player who played for the Winnipeg Blue Bombers. He won the Grey Cup with Winnipeg in 1958, 1959, 1961 and 1962.

References

1931 births
Winnipeg Blue Bombers players
Living people